Joel Diamond is an American record producer. He has produced 36 gold and platinum recordings and had over 54 recordings on the Billboard charts.

Diamond grew up in Passaic, New Jersey, and graduated from Rider College (now Rider University), where he majored in business and psychology.

References

External links
 
 
 

Record producers from New Jersey
Living people
People from Passaic, New Jersey
Year of birth missing (living people)
Rider University alumni